The Leader of the United National Party is the highest position of the largest and oldest party in Sri Lanka. The leader is appointed by the majority vote of the working committee of the party who meets at Sirikotha, when the position is vacant. 

The United National Party (UNP) (Sinhala: එක්සත් ජාතික පක්ෂය, Eksath Jathika Pakshaya, Tamil: ஐக்கிய தேசியக் கட்சி, Aikkya Thesiya Katchi), is a political party in Sri Lanka. It was previously the main ruling party in the government of Sri Lanka. 

The party had seven leaders since 1947.Former Prime Minister Ranil Wickramasinghe has been the leader since 1994. Ruwan Wijewardene is the current deputy leader of the party.

See also
 List of prime ministers of Sri Lanka
 List of presidents of Sri Lanka

References

Politics of Sri Lanka
United National Party politicians
United National Party
Sri Lanka politics-related lists